Baldface Mountain is a mountain located in Adirondack Mountains of New York located in the Town of Indian Lake south of Indian Lake.

References

Mountains of Hamilton County, New York
Mountains of New York (state)